Lindley Wood Reservoir is located in the Washburn valley north of Otley in Yorkshire, England.

History 
The reservoir was built by navvies between 1869 and 1876. In about 1872 Elizabeth Garnett was moved by the living conditions of the workers and their families who were camped here building this reservoir. She opened a Sunday School at the site and within a year she resolved to move to the camp. She was joined in her work by the Reverend Lewis Moule Evans and together they founded was known as the "Navvies Mission".

It was the first of a chain of four reservoirs built along the River Washburn. While the three higher reservoirs provide water to the city of Leeds, Lindley Wood provides compensation flows to the Washburn.

In 2002/03, the dam crest was raised  as the original height would have been overtopped during the Probable Maximum Flood (PMF).  This was part of a £6.5 million scheme to make Swinsty, Fewston and Lindley Wood reservoirs meet improved flood standards. The reservoir keeper's house at the dam was originally planned to be demolished during this work, but was built into the new, higher crest as bats were found to be living there.

During 2019/20, the spillway was relined, and the side walls were raised in a £5 million project to ensure the embankment dam was protected from erosion.

References 

Drinking water reservoirs in England
Reservoirs in North Yorkshire